Rasskazov, Rasskazova is a Russian surname. Notable people with the surname include:

Alexander Rasskazov
Kirill Rasskazov
Nikolai Rasskazov
Roman Rasskazov (born 1979), Russian race walker
Anatoly Rasskazov (born 1960), Russian photographer and illustrator
Yevgeny Rasskazov

See also
Rasskazovo

Russian-language surnames